A supportasse or underpropper is a stiffened support for a ruff or collar. Essential items of courtly fashion in the late 16th and early 17th centuries, supportasses are sometimes called piccadills (picadils, pickadills), whisks, or rebatos, terms used at different times for both the supporters and the various lace or linen collar styles to which they were attached.

Decorative supportasses were often made of wire fashioned in loops and scallops, covered over with colored silk, gold, or silver thread. Supporters stiffened with cardboard or pasteboard and covered in silk or linen were also popular. They were held in place with ties or points fastened through worked holes at the back of the collar. Examples of both types of supportasse survive in the costume collections of the Victoria and Albert Museum, the Metropolitan Museum of Art, and the Musée national du Moyen Âge (formerly Musée de Cluny).

Gallery

References

External links
Extant supportasses:
 Supportasse, England, 1600-1620. Cardboard, linen, silk, silk and linen thread, Victoria and Albert Museum T.32-1938
 Picadil, England, 1600-1615. Silk, pasteboard, silk thread. Victoria and Albert Museum 192-1900
 Collar, Italy, 16th century. Bobbin lace with visible wire supporter. Metropolitan Museum of Art 30.135.156

16th-century fashion
17th-century fashion
History of clothing (Western fashion)
Neckwear